Sean Hardman (born 6 May 1977) is a former Australian rugby union player who played as a hooker for the Queensland Reds in the Super Rugby competition. He also represented  internationally, where he made his debut against  in 2002.

Career
Hardman debuted for the Reds in 1999 against the Auckland Blues and has since played over 100 games for the Queensland side. Hardman has also represented Australia at test, under 21 and A level and was the Wallabies third string hooker at the 2007 Rugby World Cup behind Adam Freier and Stephen Moore.

Hardman made his test debut against France in 2002 but slowly fell out of favour with the Wallaby selectors despite consistent form with the Reds and did not make another test appearance until 2006 in the Wallabies 49–0 defeat against the Springboks with a cameo off the bench. Hardman would again play for the Wallabies against a second string South African side in the 2007 tri nations, again off the bench and was a surprise inclusion into the Wallabies 2007 Rugby World cup squad as the third hooker as it was expected that either Jeremy Paul or Tatafu Polota-Nau would be chosen ahead of him.

Hardman played one game at the world cup coming off the bench against Canada in Australia's final pool match.

References

External links
Queensland Reds Profile

1977 births
Australia international rugby union players
Australian rugby union players
Brothers Old Boys players
Living people
Queensland Reds players
Rugby union hookers
Rugby union players from Sydney